This is a list of members of the Victorian Legislative Council from the elections of 11 September 1884 to the elections of 3 September 1886.

There were fourteen Provinces, each returning three members for a total of 42 members.

Note the "Term in Office" refers to that members term(s) in the Council, not necessarily for that Province.

William Mitchell was President of the Council until his death, succeeded by James MacBain.

 Mitchell died 24 November 1884; replaced by William Irving Winter, sworn-in December 1884.
 Russell resigned May 1886, replaced by Joseph Connor, sworn-in in June 1886.

References

 Re-member (a database of all Victorian MPs since 1851). Parliament of Victoria.

Members of the Parliament of Victoria by term
19th-century Australian politicians